Hamilcoa is a plant genus in the family Euphorbiaceae first described as a genus in 1912. It contains only one known species, Hamilcoa zenkeri, native to Nigeria and Cameroon.

References

Monotypic Euphorbiaceae genera
Flora of Nigeria
Flora of Cameroon
Stomatocalyceae
Vulnerable plants